DTP may refer to:

Computing
 Desktop publishing, the creation of documents using page layout skills on a personal computer	 
 Distributed transaction processing, the X/Open model of coordinating transactions between multiple participants
 Dynamic Trunking Protocol, a networking protocol from Cisco
 Digital Teaching Platform, educational products
 Dependently typed programming
 Parasoft DTP, development testing platform
Data Transfer Project, an open-source initiative on data portability

Medicine
 Drug therapy problems, a categorization of drug problems in pharmaceutical care
 DTP vaccine, a triple vaccine used to inoculate against diphtheria, tetanus and pertussis
 Developmental Therapeutics Program, of the National Cancer Institute
 Distal tingling on percussion, another term for Tinel's sign
 Diphtheria toxin

Music
 Devin Townsend Project, a rock and metal group
 Disturbing tha Peace, a record label
 DTP (Sadus album)

Organizations
 Demokratik Toplum Partisi (Democratic Society Party), a former pro-Kurdish political party in Turkey
 Democrat Turkey Party (Democrat Türkiye Partisi), a minor party in the late 1990s
 Doctoral Training Partnerships, British centres for managing PhD studies
 dTP Entertainment, a German video game producer
 Dick Johnson Racing, formerly DJR Team Penske, Australia's oldest motor racing team competing in the Supercars Championship

Other
 Dynamic tidal power, a proposed technology to generate energy from the oceans
 Dubai Techno Park, a technology park in Dubai, UAE